Megachile kuschei is a species of bee in the family Megachilidae. It was described by Theodore Dru Alison Cockerell in 1939.

References

Kuschei
Insects described in 1939